"Lonely Town" is a song by American singer Brandon Flowers from his second studio album, The Desired Effect (2015). It was released on April 27, 2015, as the album's third single.

Composition
Sonically the track appears to be a breezy love song but lyrically it features lines with dual meanings (e.g., "When will you come home again? Did you lock the door when it shut?"), potentially attributable to a stalker.

Danielle Haim (of Haim) requested to play the drum part and features on the recording.

Music video
The music video for "Lonely Town" centers around a young woman (Penelope Mitchell) who is moving around a house with headphones on while dancing to the song. It is presumed that she is a guest in this house. Someone is watching her from outside her window.  The video is retro-styled.

Charts

References

2014 songs
2015 singles
Brandon Flowers songs
Island Records singles
Song recordings produced by Ariel Rechtshaid
Songs written by Brandon Flowers